The following is a list of artists who have released at least one album in the progressive rock genre. Individuals are included only if they recorded or performed progressive rock as a solo artist, regardless of whether they were a member of a progressive rock band at any point.

0–9

21st Century Schizoid Band: Band of former King Crimson members that performs a mixture of original songs, King Crimson classics, and material from the various members' solo efforts 
5uu's: Mid-1980s RIO band from Los Angeles 
10cc: British band active in the 1970s with their art pop music.

A

 Acqua Fragile
 A.C.T
 Aeon Zen
 Agitation Free: German band from the 70's similar to early Pink Floyd
 Air: French duo whose retro synth-based electronica and space pop music features progressive rock leanings
 Alamaailman Vasarat 
 The Alan Parsons Project 
 Alux Nahual: Politically oriented band that formed in Guatemala in the 1980s
 Ambrosia: Early 1970s California band that had later success with soft rock
 Amon Düül II: Band that formed out of the German late 1960s political art commune Amon Düül
 Analogy
 Anathema
 And So I Watch You from Afar
 ...And You Will Know Us by the Trail of Dead
 Jon Anderson: Lead singer of Yes
 Anderson Bruford Wakeman Howe: Late-1980s attempt by singer Jon Anderson to restore Yes to its progressive rock direction and lineup
 Anekdoten
 Ange: French symphonic prog band active mainly from the early 1970s through the mid-1980s. Their later work displays a simpler, pop orientation
 Änglagård: Swedish band of the early 1990s that played 1970s-style symphonic prog
 Aphrodite's Child: Greek trio 
 Aquarium: Band formed in the Soviet Union in the 1970s
 Arcadea: American prog synth band with Brann Dailor on drums and vocals 
 Area: Politically oriented 1970s multinational band from Italy
 Arena 
 Ark
 Armonite
 Ars Nova
 Art Bears: Henry Cow offshoot featuring Fred Frith
 Art in America
 Art Zoyd: French Zeuhl band
 Ash Ra Tempel
 Atheist
 Atoll
 Atomic Rooster: British heavy prog band originally featuring Carl Palmer before his departure to Emerson Lake & Palmer
 Kevin Ayers: Founding member of Soft Machine
 Ayreon: Dutch progressive metal project from the mid-1990s onward
 Ayurveda

B

Babylon 
Back Door: Once produced by Carl Palmer
Barclay James Harvest 
Be-Bop Deluxe: British band who combined art rock and glam rock, influencing new wave
David Bedford 
Beggars Opera: Scottish band of the early 1970s 
Bi Kyo Ran 
Big Big Train are an English progressive rock band formed in Bournemouth in 1990.
Bigelf 
The Birds of Satan: American progressive hard rock supergroup led by the Foo Fighters' drummer Taylor Hawkins
Birth Control: German band from the early 1970s
Bozzio Levin Stevens: A late 1990s supergroup 
Brainticket 
Brand X: Late 1970s band influenced by jazz and funk, frequently associated with Phil Collins 
Arthur Brown
Jack Bruce
Bruford: Jazz and Canterbury-style supergroup with Bill Bruford, Allan Holdsworth, Dave Stewart and Jeff Berlin
Buckethead: Highly virtuosic and experimental guitarist 
Kate Bush: British singer-songwriter with progressive rock leanings, discovered by David Gilmour

C

Camel: Major band from the mid-1970s classic era of prog
Can: Influential German band heavily influenced by 20th century composition
The Cancer Conspiracy
Caravan: Major Canterbury band, active primarily during the 1970s
Caravan of Dreams: Solo project of Caravan bassist Richard Sinclair
Cast: Mexican band that formed in the late 1970s, who frequently appeared at or organized prog festivals during the 1990s
Cathedral
Cherry Five: Italian band who finally released a second album in 2015
Chiodos 
Clearlight: French band from the 70's similar to early Gong but closer to symphonic prog
Cluster
Coheed and Cambria
Cold Fairyland: Band from Shanghai rooted in traditional Chinese music 
Colosseum
Curved Air
Cynic
Holger Czukay

D

Darryl Way's Wolf 
Dead Can Dance
Death Organ 
The Decemberists: Indie rock band with strong Jethro Tull and Genesis influences.
Deep Purple: British hard rock band with strong progressive influences. Often known as one of the three first heavy metal bands along with Black Sabbath and Led Zeppelin. 
Demon Fuzz: English band that played progressive rock, soul and funk, with influences from psychedelic soul, jazz, acid rock and world music.
Deus Ex Machina: 1990s Italian rock band that updates the 1970s Italian progressive rock style 
DFA 
The Dillinger Escape Plan 
Discipline: Led by the Matthew Parmenter, combined the stylings of Genesis and Van der Graaff Generator 
Dixie Dregs
Djam Karet: 1980s US band that was a precursor to math rock 
The Doors: American band considered to be part of the Proto-prog subgenre.
Dream Theater: American/Canadian band of ex-Berklee students that helped to raise the profile of progressive metal during the 1990s and 2000s
Dungen 
Francis Dunnery and the New Progressives

E

East of Eden
Echolyn: Among the more prominent prog bands of the 1990s, with metaphysical, literary-inspired lyrics
Edison's Children: Pete Trewavas of Marillion and Transatlantic's band with Eric Blackwood featuring Rick Armstrong (son of 1st Man on the Moon Neil Armstrong)
Egg: Dave Stewart on keys 
Elbow: English rock band with progressive leanings
Electric Light Orchestra (ELO): English band who played string and synth-based "Beatlesque" prog rock, and achieved further success with their pop and disco-influenced music
Eloy: A German band most prominent during the 1970s but who have continued to perform through lineup changes 
Emerson, Lake & Palmer (ELP): One of the most influential of the "classic era" prog bands 
Emerson, Lake & Powell: A brief, mid-1980s incarnation of ELP in which Cozy Powell was the drummer 
England: A late 1970s British band that was a forerunner to neo-progressive rock 
The Enid: A British band formed in the 1970s by Barclay James Harvest arranger Robert John Godfrey, who have remained intermittently active from the 1980s onward. 
Brian Eno

F

Faith No More
Family: '60s–'70s British band that contributed members to Blind Faith and King Crimson 
Faust 
Finch (Dutch band) Instrumental Dutch symphonic prog band from the 70's 
Fish: Former Marillion lead singer 
Flash: Band formed by Peter Banks after his departure from Yes 
The Flower Kings: Symphonic prog band, from Sweden, active from the 1990s onward. 
Focus: Mainly instrumental Dutch group who are best known for their Top 10 single, the 1971 song "Hocus Pocus"  
Robert Fripp: Founding member and lead guitarist of King Crimson 
Fripp & Eno 
Fred Frith 
Hasse Fröberg and the Musical Companion 
FromUz 
Frost*: Neo-progressive band from the 2000s
Frumpy: German prog band from the early seventies with female vocals 
FSB 
Fusion Orchestra 
The Future Kings of England

G

Peter Gabriel: Former lead singer of Genesis, who used many world music influences in his solo material 
Genesis: One of the major classic era bands and a definitive example of the symphonic prog style. They transitioned to more accessible music starting in 1978 (though they still included progressive rock songs on each of the albums that came out after), but their prog material has been influential through the decades 
Gentle Giant: Exceptionally complex band with a medieval-sounding style who are considered to be among the most important of the 1970s progressive rock bands 
Ghost 
Gilgamesh 
Glass Hammer 
Goblin: Funk-influenced Italian band known for film soundtrack work 
Gong 
Gov't Mule: Combines elements of blues, hard rock, and jazz fusion 
Grails: Eclectic, textural band from the 2000s 
Marek Grechuta 
Greenslade 
Grobschnitt: 1970s symphonic prog band from Germany who gave highly entertaining live shows and pursued a more commercial direction during the 1980s  
Gryphon: 1970s British band who used a medieval folk style and played period instruments such as krumhorns 
Guru Guru

H

Hail the Sun
Peter Hammill: Lead singer of Van Der Graaf Generator  
Bo Hansson 
Happy the Man: Highly virtuosic 1970s symphonic prog band who performed mainly in the Washington, D.C. area 
Harmonium (band)
Hatfield and the North 
Hawkwind: Long-running space rock band with science fiction lyrics and some crossover with heavy metal 
Haze 
Henry Cow: Highly experimental and political 1970s British band who founded the Rock in Opposition movement 
 Here & Now: Late-1970s British band that combined elements of punk rock and progressive rock 
Hidria Spacefolk: Space rock band
Steve Hillage: Guitarist from Gong  
Hoelderlin: German prog band from the 70's who started out in the folk prog direction before moving into symphonic territory
Steve Howe: English musician best known as the lead guitarist of Yes

I

The Incredible String Band: Early British folk/prog hybrid 
Indian Summer 
Iona: British band active since the late 1980s whose lyrics contain a Christian element 
IQ: One of the most prominent Neo-progressive rock bands of the 1980s 
It Bites: 1980s pop/prog band 
IZZ

J

Jade Warrior 
Jadis: Neo-progressive band 
Jane: Early 1970s krautrock band 
Jeavestone 
Jethro Tull: Started in the late-1960s as a British blues band, heavily influenced by jazz and British folk rock, who quickly developed into one of progressive rock's major acts 
Jon Lord

K

Kaipa: 1970s Swedish band whose Roine Stolt went on to form The Flower Kings 
Kansas: The most prominent US symphonic prog band of the 1970s, who suffered personnel changes and moved to a more commercial style in the 1980s 
Karnataka 
Karnivool: Early work was in alternative metal style, more recent albums have been in progressive rock style.
Mike Keneally 
Khan 
King Crimson: One of the genre's best-known and most influential bands, who have frequently disbanded and regrouped with radically different lineups and musical styles 
King's X
Kingdom Come: Early 1970s British band fronted by Arthur Brown 
Kingston Wall 
Klaatu: Canadian trio whose anonymity and style lead the press to believe they were the Beatles reincarnated
Kraan 
Kraftwerk 
Krokus: Debuted as a progressive rock band, then became a metal band in the style of AC/DC

L

Landberk 
Lana Lane
Bill Laswell 
Lightning Bolt 
Liquid Tension Experiment: A band that formed as a Dream Theater side project and includes John Petrucci and Tony Levin 
Lucifer's Friend: early heavy metal/progressive rock band 
Marco Lo Muscio 
Arjen Anthony Lucassen: Leader of the Ayreon project

M

Magellan 
Magenta 
Magma: A French band who launched the Zeuhl subgenre in the 1970s.
Magna Carta: An English progressive folk group.
Magnum 
Mahavishnu Orchestra: An early fusion band that was a major influence on King Crimson and others.
Manfred Mann's Earth Band: An eclectic mixture of hard rock, fusion, and progressive rock 
Albert Marcoeur 
Marillion: British neo-progressive band 
The Mars Volta 
Mastermind 
Mastodon 
Matching Mole: A 1970s Canterbury band
McDonald & Giles: An early King Crimson offshoot 
Mercury Rev 
Metamorfosi: Italian prog band from the early 70's who reformed in the 2000s 
Mew 
Midlake 
Miriodor: A Canadian RIO band 
miRthkon 
Mogul Thrash: Early 1970s British band that included John Wetton 
Mona Lisa 
The Moody Blues: Classical rock pioneers who are credited as having created the first progressive rock album, Days of Future Passed 
Moon Safari: A Swedish band that makes extensive use of complex vocal harmonies 
Mt. Helium
Patrick Moraz 
Mostly Autumn 
Mr. Bungle: American experimental rock/metal band that has included progressive rock elements
Mudvayne
Muse 
Museo Rosenbach 
My Brightest Diamond 
Mystery Jets

N

National Health 
Nektar 
Neu!  
Nexus Progressive Symphonic Rock from Argentina 
The New York Rock & Roll Ensemble: A 1960s–1970s classical rock group 
Niacin 
The Nice: Highly influential early classical rock band fronted by Keith Emerson 
Czeslaw Niemen 
Erik Norlander: Keyboardist who has performed solo and with Ayreon

O

Oceansize 
Mike Oldfield: Studio performer who often played every instrument in his large-scale compositions 
Omega: Hungarian band formed in the 1960s 
Opeth: Swedish progressive rock band with death metal roots
Le Orme: One of the most important Italian progressive rock bands
Osibisa: Ghanaian Afro-pop and Afrobeat band who incorporate funk, jazz, and progressive rock. Their album covers were illustrated by Roger Dean
Ozric Tentacles

P

Pain of Salvation 
Pallas: A neo-progressive band 
Carl Palmer 
Panzerballett 
Passport 
Pavlov's Dog: US art rock band from the 1970s featuring much mellotron. Bill Bruford from Yes guested on drums on their second album.
Pendragon: A neo-progressive band 
Anthony Phillips: Original guitarist for Genesis 
The Physics House Band: Brighton-based experimental rockers
Picchio dal Pozzo 
The Pineapple Thief 
Pink Floyd: Pioneering space rock band who went on to become one of the major progressive rock bands.
Planet X: A band fronted by former Dream Theater keyboardist Derek Sherinian 
The Plastic People of the Universe 
Platypus 
Popol Vuh 
Porcupine Tree 
Premiata Forneria Marconi (PFM): A major Italian band of the early 1970s, once produced by Peter Sinfield who also wrote English lyrics for the band 
Present: 1990s Belgian group led by Univers Zero guitarist Roger Trigaux and his son Reginald. 
Primus: American trio who channel funk metal, alternative metal, and progressive rock
Procol Harum: Early progressive rock band which recorded with orchestras 
Proto-Kaw: A progressive jam band formed by Kerry Livgren of Kansas 
Pulsar 
Puppet Show 
Pure Reason Revolution

Q

Quasar 
Quatermass 
Queen: Throughout their career, Queen embraced progressive rock, heavy metal, music hall, glam rock, and pop mostly on their first two albums Queen and Queen II
Quiet Sun

R

Rare Bird 
Refugee 
Remedy 
Renaissance: Early 1970s symphonic prog band known for a strong classical influence and Annie Haslam's operatic vocals 
Ritual 
Riverside 
Roxy Music 
RPWL 
Todd Rundgren 
Jordan Rudess 
Rudess/Morgenstein Project: A collaboration between Dream Theater keyboardist Jordan Rudess and Dixie Dregs drummer Rod Morgenstein 
Rush

S

Sa–Sm

Saga: A Canadian neo-progressive band who had some US success 
Samla Mammas Manna: A RIO band with folk influences 
SBB 
Paul Schutze 
Secret Machines 
Semiramis 
Seventh Wave 
Derek Sherinian 
Shub-Niggurath: A French Zeuhl band 
Sigur Ros: Icelandic post-rock band
Sikth: British progressive metal and djent band
Peter Sinfield 
Slapp Happy: A late-1970s offshoot of Henry Cow 
Sleepytime Gorilla Museum: A Californian RIO band 
Skin Alley: Progressive band from the late 60s-early 70s whose work has influences from blues rock, jazz fusion, and art rock.

Sn–Sz

Snovi: A hybrid Electro-Organic band that congregates influences of several branches of the Electronic Music and Heavy Progressive Rock
Soft Heap 
Soft Machine: Canterbury scene band initially playing psychedelic rock, the band became successful with experimental jazz rock and free jazz
Solaris 
Solstice 
Sparks: American art rock duo who played glam rock, synth-pop and disco
Spirit: A psychedelic band that was a major influence on early progressive rock 
Split Enz: Started out as a prog band, but moved to new wave starting in 1979
Spock's Beard: Prominent US 1990s symphonic prog band 
Chris Squire: An English musician best known as the bassist of Yes 
Starcastle: A progressive band from the US similar to Yes
Stackridge: English progressive rock, pop, and folk band who have been described as precursors of Britpop
Al Stewart  
Stormy Six: A politically active 1970s Italian band who later aligned with RIO 
Strawbs: British 1970s symphonic prog band with strong folk roots
Stick Men 
Still: A late-1990s version of Echolyn 
Stolen Babies
Stranglers: Formed in 1974 and heavily influenced by prog rock though generally regarded as a punk rock act.
Styx: A US band who played extended compositions and classical adaptations with a hard rock edge, then became successful playing arena rock
Supertramp 
Survival: Dutch progressive/symphonic rock band
Syd Arthur: A modern band in the Canterbury style 
Sylvan 
 Symphony X
 System of a Down: American-Armenian nu metal band that has also played progressive metal

T

Taï Phong 
Tangerine Dream: A highly influential German band of electronic innovators 
Serj Tankian
Tasavallan Presidentti 
Tears For Fears
Tempest: A 1970s band featuring Allan Holdsworth and Jon Hiseman 
Ten Jinn: A band featuring former Happy the Man guitarist Stan Whitaker 
The Tangent: An eclectic progressive band 
Thinking Plague: A 1990s RIO band 
Third Ear Band 
Thirty Seconds to Mars: Alternative rock band whose early work contained progressive rock influences
This Heat: A late 1970s British band with prog, punk, and avant-garde elements 
Three 
Ton Steine Scherben: A politically vocal Krautrock band 
The Tony Williams Lifetime: A rock-oriented fusion band with psychedelic elements
Tool: A Los-Angeles alternative band who helped define the progressive metal genre during the 1990s and 2000s
Touchstone 
Transatlantic: A supergroup with members of Dream Theater, Spock's Beard, The Flower Kings and Marillion 
Trans-Siberian Orchestra 
TriPod 
Triana: A flamenco-influenced 1970s Spanish band 
Triumvirat: German power trio fronted by virtuoso keyboardist Jürgen Fritz.
Twelfth Night

U

U.K.: Late 1970s supergroup that recorded just two studio albums  With King Crimson's John Wetton and Bill Bruford on their first album 
Umphrey's McGee: 6 piece Progressive Jam Band from South Bend, Indiana. Known for their relentless touring schedule, wide-ranging sound implementing countless genres and influences, stunning live performances, flawless covers, and top tier light show. 
Univers Zero: A 1970s Belgian Zeuhl band 
Uriah Heep: British progressive rock band who draw on metal, acid rock, and folk
Utopia

V

Van der Graaf Generator: A highly influential 1970s British band 
Christian Vander 
Vangelis 
Voivod: Canadian  progressive metal band with thrash metal roots 
Von Hertzen Brothers

W

Rick Wakeman: Among the genre's best-known keyboard virtuosos, recorded a string of concept albums as a solo artist as well as being a member of Yes and recording with David Bowie
Jeff Wayne
John Wetton
White Willow
Wigwam
Steven Wilson
Winger
Wishbone Ash
Robert Wyatt

Y

Stomu Yamash'ta 
Yes: A British symphonic prog band from the 1970s onward

Z

Frank Zappa: The experimentalism, eclecticism and virtuosity in Zappa's music are of a progressive rock nature.

See also 

Ambient music
Art rock
Berlin School of electronic music
Captain Beefheart
British folk rock
Free jazz
Italian progressive rock
Jam band
Jazz fusion
Minimalism
Musique concrete
No wave
Post-rock
Progressive metal
Serialism
Steely Dan
Symphonic rock
Third stream
Zeuhl

References

 
 
 
 
 
  
 
 
 
 
 
 
 

 
 
 
 
 
 
 
 
 
 
 
 
 
 
 
 
 
 
 
 
 
 
 
 
 
 
 
 
 
 
 
 
 

 
 
 
 
 
 
 
  
 
 
 
 
 
 
 
 
 
 
 
 
 
 
 
 
 
  
 
 
 
 
 
 
 
 
 
 
 
 
 
 
 
  
 
 
  
 
 
 
 
 
 
 
 
 
 
 
 
  
 
  
 
 
 

 
 

Progressive rock artists